George Gardner Symons (1861-1930) was an American impressionist painter.

Biography
He was born in either 1861 or 1863 in Chicago, Illinois. Attending the School of the Art Institute of Chicago, Symons also studied in Europe and won awards at the National Academy of Design and the Corcoran Gallery of Art. A plein-air painter, he built the first studio in the art colony of Laguna Beach, California during the early 1900s. He died in Hillside, New Jersey in 1930.

References

External links

 
Symons at The Athenaeum
Biographical Notes, a collection of biographical information and images of 50 American artists, containing information about the artist on page 46.
Two exhibition catalogs, available from the Metropolitan Museum of Art Libraries.

1861 births
1930 deaths
Artists from Chicago
People from Laguna Beach, California
Painters from California
American Impressionist painters
19th-century American painters
American male painters
20th-century American painters
Painters from Illinois
19th-century American male artists
20th-century American male artists